Burlington Memorial Auditorium is a 2,500-seat multi-purpose arena, in Burlington, Vermont. It was built in 1927 (Frank Lyman Austin, architect), and is operated by the Burlington Department of Parks and Recreation. As a convention center, it offers  of space.  The main space contains a 27-by-80-foot proscenium stage.  The building also has two smaller event spaces.

It was also used for concerts, conventions, trade shows, graduations, pro wrestling and other special events.
Such artists as Bob Dylan and Simon & Garfunkel have performed here.

It was one of the homes of the Vermont Frost Heaves, formerly of the PBL.

In July 2016, the structure was deemed structurally unsafe for use or occupancy by the city engineer, requiring the two groups leasing it (the 242 Main youth center and Burlington City Arts Project) to move out.

References

External links
Official webpage

American Basketball Association (2000–present) venues
Indoor arenas in Vermont
Sports venues in Vermont
1927 establishments in Vermont
Sports venues completed in 1927